Georgi Vladimirovich Sviridenko (born December 3, 1962 in Minsk, Belarusian SSR) is a former Soviet/Belarusian handball player who competed in the 1988 Summer Olympics.

In 1988 he won the gold medal with the Soviet team. He played all six matches and scored twelve goals.

External links
profile

1962 births
Living people
Soviet male handball players
Belarusian male handball players
Handball players at the 1988 Summer Olympics
Olympic handball players of the Soviet Union
Olympic gold medalists for the Soviet Union
Olympic medalists in handball
Sportspeople from Minsk
Medalists at the 1988 Summer Olympics